Styliani Gioupi (born 6 February 1978) is a Greek handball player who competed in the 2004 Summer Olympics.

References

1978 births
Living people
Greek female handball players
Olympic handball players of Greece
Handball players at the 2004 Summer Olympics
Mediterranean Games competitors for Greece
Competitors at the 2005 Mediterranean Games